Licker's Last Leg is the first full length studio album by Goon Moon, and the follow-up to 2005's I Got a Brand New Egg Layin' Machine. The record was released via Ipecac Recordings on May 8, 2007. The album features cameos by longtime Goss collaborator Josh Homme and drummer Josh Freese.

Track listing

References

External links 
 Jeordie White's Youtube channel featuring a large number of Goon Moon videos.

Goon Moon albums
Ipecac Recordings albums
2007 albums